Nini Arlette Theilade (15 June 1915 – 13 February 2018) was a Danish ballet dancer, choreographer and teacher.

Early life
Theilade was born in Purwokerto, Dutch East Indies. Her mother, Joanna Catarina, was of Polish, German, and French extraction, while her father, Hans Theilade, was an engineer. In 1926, on the family's return to Denmark, she attended Asta Mollerup's ballet school in Copenhagen.

After she was refused entry to the Royal Ballet's school when she was 12, her mother took her to Paris, hoping the best teachers of the time would ensure her development. Although Nini soon appeared in Carina Ari's performances in Montreux with the Opéra Comique ballet company, her mother was more ambitious. She decided to place her with the highly reputed Paris school run by Lubov Egorova who trained the stars of the Ballets Russes.

Career

Dancer
In 1929, aged 14, Theilade appeared in The Hague in a solo programme of various pieces choreographed by Asta Mollerup. She was such a success that she went on tour in the Netherlands, Germany, Denmark, Switzerland, France, Sweden and Finland. In 1931, she was a guest performer at the Royal Theatre, Copenhagen before touring the United States.

From 1931, under Max Reinhardt, she appeared in Berlin, Vienna, Salzburg and Florence. She also starred both as a dancer and actress in Reinhardt's Hollywood film A Midsummer Night's Dream in 1935.

From 1938-40, she played many leading roles in the Ballet Russe de Monte Carlo which were choreographed for her by Léonide Massine. They included Poverty in Nobilissima Visione and Venus in Bacchanale with costumes by Salvador Dalí. She performed as a guest at New York's Metropolitan Opera dancing to Debussy's Clouds.

Choreographer and instructor
During the war years, she went to Brazil where she met her first husband, Piet Loopuyt, a Dutchman, with whom she had two children. They travelled widely together before arriving in Rio de Janeiro where Theilade became an instructor.

In the 1950s, she was invited back to Copenhagen as a choreographer. Among her productions were Metaphor with music by Niels Viggo Bentzon with Mona Vangsaa in the highly erotic leading role, and Concerto with music by Robert Schumann. In 1965, she settled in Denmark, producing Græsstrået, one of the earliest ballets for television, by composer Else Marie Pade and author El Forman. It was followed by Psyche and Kalkbillede.

From 1969 to 1978, she founded a ballet academy in Thurø with a ballet company that toured Europe. She also began her involvement as ballet instructor at Odense Theatre's school which was to last 30 years. After running into financial difficulties at Thurø, she and her second husband, Arne Buchter-Larsen, accepted an invitation to set up a three-year course of study in Lyon, the Académie de Ballet Nini Theilade. Her school is still active today, with classes of ballet, modern jazz, contemporary, baroque, de caractère, historical (Renaissance, 19th century), and Irish dance. She left Lyon in 1990 at the age of 75 to return to Denmark where she continued to be active in drama and dance productions. In particular, she was to work for a further 20 years as dance instructor at Oure Folk School on the island of Funen. She died on 13 February 2018 at the age of 102.

References

1915 births
2018 deaths
Prima ballerinas
Danish ballerinas
Danish centenarians
People from Banyumas Regency
Women centenarians